Hempstead High School is a public high school located in Hempstead, New York, United States. It is the Hempstead Union Free School District's only high school.

As of the 2014-15 school year, the school had an enrollment of 2,226 students and 116.0 classroom teachers (on an FTE basis), for a student–teacher ratio of 19.2:1. There were 1,346 students (60.5% of enrollment) eligible for free lunch and 34 (1.5% of students) eligible for reduced-cost lunch.

History
In the early 20th century, high school students from East Meadow, Roosevelt, Uniondale (East Hempstead), and West Hempstead, in addition to Hempstead Village, all attended Hempstead High School.  The tuition to Hempstead SD #1 was paid by the neighboring Common School Districts.  It was not until the late 1950s that the last of these school districts built their own high schools. In July 1970, the original Hempstead High School was burned down under presumably suspicious circumstances only 20 minutes after summer school classes were dismissed for the day.

In 2014, Hempstead schools came to the attention of the New York State Education Department after a school document was leaked. This document revealed that 33 Hispanic students had been signing in for attendance each morning, only to be told to return home because there was not classroom space for them. The state later found that the number of excluded students may have been as high as 59, and threatened to remove school officials if they did not implement reforms. In a 2015 agreement with the New York Attorney General, the school agreed to implement new enrollment procedures and hire an independent monitor.

Design
The high school building is a three-level structure with an open courtyard in the center of the school. The school is built on a marshy area, and local legend holds that the school sinks a few inches every year. The school consists of three buildings: The "A" building, in which most of the classes are held and where the student lockers are located; the "B" building, which serves as home to the media center, administrative offices, the MCJROTC room, and a few classrooms; and the "C" building, which consists of the gymnasium, the nurses office, the auditorium, the student and faculty lunch rooms, and the science classrooms on the lower level. Renovations currently underway will relocate lockers to the school hallways, as they presently sit in the "commons" of the A building on the first floor. Hempstead High School also has an indoor swimming pool that reopened after renovations in the spring of 2005.

Academics
Once a school of high academic, music and athletic standing from the early 1900s to the mid 1970s, the school experienced difficulties during a period a change in the town and Nassau County during the 1980s into the 21st century.

Hempstead HS experienced  again began to show signs of improvements with the graduating classes of 2005 and 2006. In 2004, 57% of Hempstead's students passed the Math A Regents Examination (state average: 78%), up from 28% in 2003. In English for 2004, the passing rate stood at 66%, up from 49% in 2003 (state average: 77%). In Physics, Hempstead had an 88% passing rate, compared to an 81% state average. Hempstead also offers Advanced Placement courses in English, Biology, Chemistry, Spanish, United States History, French, and World History. There was an attempt to cut these classes, but a student protest in 2005 kept the Advanced Placement curriculum in place.

Extracurricular activities

Student government
Hempstead is noted for its student government program, widely accepted to be one of the most active in Nassau County. The group consists of a four-member executive council and a Senate composed of 12th and 11th grade students, and a House of Representatives, composed of 9th and 10th grade students. Elections are held in October and members must be elected every year. The executive board is elected by the Senate and the House. Both the Senate and the House of Representatives have their own leader, the Majority Leader and the Speaker of the House respectively. The student government ratified its current constitution in November 2004. The student government is advised by History teacher Donald A. Jackson.

Sports
Hempstead competes in class 1A, the largest classification in Nassau County. The Tigers football team is a storied one.

Notable alumni
 A+ (Andre Levins; born 1981), rapper noted for his hit "All I See", attended Hempstead High School and named his album released in 1999, Hempstead High.
 Tavorris Bell (born 1978), Harlem Globetrotter
 Spider Harrison, DJ and entertainer
 Reuben L. Haskell, U.S. Representative
 Tu Holloway (born 1989), basketball player for Maccabi Rishon LeZion in the Israeli Basketball Premier League.
 John Mackey, football player, Baltimore Colts and San Diego Chargers, Pro Football Hall of Famer, graduated 1959.
 Rob Moore, football player, New York Jets, Arizona Cardinals, and Denver Broncos, graduated 1986.
 David Paterson (born 1954), Governor of New York (2008–10), graduated 1971.
Ray Platnick (1917–1986), press and war photographer.
 The Product G&B, a singing duo best known for their collaborative hit with Carlos Santana, "Maria Maria"; both attended Hempstead High School.
 Eric "Vietnam" Sadler, Hempstead High 1975–78, music producer
 Raymond Gniewek ('49), Concertmaster for the Metropolitan Opera Orchestra.

References

External links
 Hempstead Schools Website
 Long Island School Rant

Public high schools in New York (state)
Hempstead (village), New York
Schools in Nassau County, New York